School Lake may refer to:
School Lake (Berrien County, Michigan)
School Lake (Brown County, Minnesota)
School Lake (Le Sueur County, Minnesota)
School Lake, a lake in Madelia Township of Watonwan County, Minnesota
School Lake, a lake in Odin Township of Watonwan County, Minnesota
School Lake (South Dakota)